Thomas Umfrey Wells (6 February 1927 – 30 July 2001) was a New Zealand-born first-class cricketer and educator who played first-class cricket in England in the early 1950s. All but one of his appearances were for Cambridge University, but he also played one match for Worcestershire in 1950.

Life and career
Wells was educated at King's College, Auckland, and the University of Auckland where he was awarded blues for cricket in 1948 and 1949 and was captain in 1949. He then won an Orford Studentship for King's College, Cambridge.

He made his first-class debut for Cambridge against the touring West Indians at Fenner's in May 1950, though his part in the match was small, not batting, holding a single catch and bowling three wicketless overs for 28. The game itself was a very high scoring draw: John Dewes (183) and David Sheppard (227) put on 343 for Cambridge's first wicket, and the university declared at 594/4. In reply the tourists piled up 703/3, including a career-best 304 not out by Everton Weekes.

Wells made more of an impact in his second game, against Leicestershire, where his unbeaten 77 was the highest score of his first-class career. He also picked up the first of his handful of wickets when he bowled Leicestershire's Australian batsman Vic Jackson.
His only other half-century came just a week later when he notched 53 against the Free Foresters.

Wells' single appearance for Worcestershire was in August 1950, when the county played Somerset at New Road. He had a poor match, scoring 0 and 9, and though he did take two catches they were both to dismiss tail-enders. Worcestershire collapsed in their first innings against the leg-spin of Johnny Lawrence, who took career-best figures of 8-41, and Somerset won the match by four wickets.

Wells played on for Cambridge in 1951, without conspicuous success, and made a final first-class appearance for the university against Surrey at The Oval in June 1952. Opening the batting in both innings, he scored 26 and 13 as Cambridge went down to an innings defeat. He did play occasional minor games thereafter, for example appearing for the London New Zealand Club when the New Zealanders toured England in 1958.

Wells taught at Clifton College from 1952 to 1960, then returned to the country of his birth where he was appointed headmaster of Collegiate School at Whanganui, a position he held from 1960 to 1980. He played cricket for Wanganui against Nelson in the 1964-65 Hawke Cup.

References

External links

New Zealand cricketers
Worcestershire cricketers
Cambridge University cricketers
1927 births
2001 deaths
People educated at King's College, Auckland
University of Auckland alumni
Alumni of King's College, Cambridge
New Zealand schoolteachers